Dwarsligger ("sleeper" or "crossbeam" in Dutch) is a book printed with text parallel to the spine of a conventional 12cm book. The dwarsligger is published by Uitgeverij Dwarsligger, part of Veen Bosch & Keuning Uitgeversgroep (VBK).

History 
The dwarsligger was conceived by Hugo van Woerden, the director of the Dutch printer Jongbloed BV, a publishing house that specializes in printing on very thin paper that is commonly used for printing the Bible. The objective of this printing format was to deliver a new type of book that read pleasantly, was easy to carry, and did not collapse. Jongbloed BV only focused on printing Christian books, a niche market that proved too small. To expand interest in the book style, Jongbloed BV granted a license to Ambo / Anthos publishers.

The dwarsligger was registered as a trademark by Jongbloed BV in July 2006.

On September 6, 2009, the first Dutch copy of the dwarsligger entered circulation. The first copy, the Manuscripta by Herman Koch, was awarded to Ronald Plasterk, Minister of Education, Culture and Science.

Features 
The special binding method permits the dwarsligger to remain open without restraint, and can be browsed and read with one hand. The use of thin papers reduces the amount of raw materials used by conventional books. The format is amenable to various types of books such as novels, thrillers and non-fiction. Published by Uitgeverij dwarsligger, the format has been used in various titles by authors such as Herman Koch, Saskia Noort, Paulien Cornelisse and Dan Brown. In some cases the dwarsligger appears at the same time as the regular edition.

International 
In addition to the Dutch and Flemish market, they are also trying to launch the book format elsewhere. In 2010, the format entered the Spanish market and one year later the English publisher Hodder & Stoughton published a few dwarsliggers, under the name Flipback. In 2011, the Lutheran Bible was published in Germany in dwarsligger format. In 2018, Penguin Random House launched the first American titles in the format under the "Penguin Minis" collection.

Variants 
According to the trade journal Boekblad the publishers A.W. Bruna Uitgevers, Dutch Media and Nieuw Amsterdam launched the cross reader on September 15, 2010. In terms of size and appearance, the cross reader was very similar to the dwarsligger but with different paper: the dwarsligger is printed on thin paper, the cross reader is printed on pocket paper. The Belgian newspaper De Morgen reported on September 23, 2010 that the Dutch printing company Jongbloed, which holds the patent on the dwarsligger, considered legal action. The magazine Boekblad wrote on October 22, 2010 that lawyers were determining whether the Characters (an initiative of the publisher Karakter) and the cross reader violate the patent. On March 7, 2011 the publishers Dutch Media, A.W. Bruna and Nieuw Amsterdam announced that they had stopped selling cross readers because sales were below expectations. On March 11, 2011, the Karakter publishing house decided not to place their variant of the dwarsligger on the market.

References

External links 
 Official website

Book formats